The departments of Benin are subdivided into 77 communes, which in turn are divided into arrondissements and finally into villages or city districts. Prior to 1999 provinces were broken down into 84 districts, titled either urban or rural.  Before independence, the six provinces were subdivided into Cercles, cantons, préfectures and villages or towns.

The communes are listed below, by department:


Alibori 

Banikoara
Gogounou
Kandi
Karimama
Malanville
Segbana

Atakora 

Boukoumbé
Cobly
Kérou
Kouandé
Matéri
Natitingou
Pehonko
Tanguiéta
Toucountouna

Atlantique 

Abomey-Calavi
Allada
Kpomassè
Ouidah
Sô-Ava
Toffo
Tori-Bossito
Zè

Borgou 

Bembèrèkè
Kalalé
N'Dali
Nikki
Parakou
Pèrèrè
Sinendé
Tchaourou

Collines 

Bantè
Dassa-Zoumè
Glazoué
Ouèssè
Savalou
Savé

Donga 

Bassila
Copargo
Djougou Rural
Djougou Urban
Ouaké

Kouffo 

Aplahoué
Djakotomey
Klouékanmè
Lalo
Toviklin
Dogbo-Tota

Littoral 

Cotonou

Mono 

Athiémé
Bopa
Comé
Grand-Popo
Houéyogbé
Lokossa

Ouémé 

Adjarra
Adjohoun
Aguégués
Akpro-Missérété
Avrankou
Bonou
Dangbo
Porto Novo
Sèmè-Kpodji

Plateau 

Ifangni
Adja-Ouèrè
Kétou
Pobè
Sakété

Zou 

Abomey
Agbangnizoun
Bohicon
Cové
Djidja
Ouinhi
Za-Kpota
Zangnanado
Zogbodomey

References

Sources 
 
 http://www.ambassade-benin.org/article20.html (French)

 
Subdivisions of Benin
Benin, Communes
Benin 2
Communes, Benin
Benin geography-related lists